Champ de Mars is a ghost station along line 8 of the Paris Métro, between the stations la Motte-Picquet - Grenelle and École Militaire.  It is situated in the 7th arrondissement of Paris, to the southwest of the public garden called Champ de Mars.

The station
The station was opened in 1913 and was closed on 2 September 1939. Today, a station of line C of the RER situated to the northwest of the public garden Champ de Mars has taken its name and is called Champ de Mars - Tour Eiffel, with a connection to line 6 at the station Bir-Hakeim.

Railway stations in France opened in 1913
1939 disestablishments in France
Ghost stations of the Paris Métro
Paris Métro line 8
Paris Métro stations in the 7th arrondissement of Paris
Railway stations closed in 1939